Arandu,  is a town in the Chitral District of Khyber Pakhtunkhwa, Pakistan, on the banks of the Landai Sin River just above its confluence with the Kunar River. Arandu lies on the border with Kunar Province, Afghanistan.

History

Demography 
Ethnically most residents are Khowar, and Gawar-Bati is the language spoken by the majority of the people in Arandu. As Arandu has a low elevation and is the last village in Chitral District on the traditional trade route to Kabul, locally this language is also known as Aranduiwar. Pashto, Urdu, and Khowar are also spoken and understood.

Geography 
Arandu is located on the banks of the Landai Sin River (Bashgal River) just above its intersection with the Kunar River (Chitral River), along the Drosh-Jalalabad Road. The Drosh-Jalalabad Road, including water traffic along the Kunar, used to be part of a major trade route from India to Kabul. Arundu is built on river benches that rise above the agricultural fields next to the two rivers. The Lowari Range is across the Kunar to the north and west, while Mount Raskarla rises to  four kilometers to the east.

Climate 
Arandu has the lowest elevation of any place in Chitral District and maintains tropical weather during the summer and warmer temperatures than the rest of Chitral in winter. The winters are rainier than the summers.  Its climate is classified as warm and temperate, and is listed as Csa by Köppen and Geiger. The average annual temperature is 17.6 °C in arandu. The average annual rainfall is 800 mm.

See also 
Ziarat, Khyber Pakhtunkhwa
Domel Nisar
Kunar Province
Lowari Pass
Lowari Tunnel

Notes and references 

Populated places in Chitral District